Małgorzata Barlak-Kamasińska (born 7 July 1952) is a Polish gymnast. She competed at the 1972 Summer Olympics.

References

External links
 

1952 births
Living people
Polish female artistic gymnasts
Olympic gymnasts of Poland
Gymnasts at the 1972 Summer Olympics
Sportspeople from Katowice
20th-century Polish women